Daniel Richard Huttlestone (born 17 September 1999) is an English actor. He is best known for his role as Gavroche in Tom Hooper's Les Misérables and Jack in the musical film Into the Woods, which both earned him a 2013 and 2015  Young Artist Award nomination as Best Young Supporting Actor in a Feature Film.

Career
Huttlestone started his stage career from the age of 9, landing the role of "Nipper" in the 2009 production of Oliver! at the Theatre Royal Drury Lane, performing on the opening night with Rowan Atkinson, and continuing until it closed in 2011. He went on to perform the role of Gavroche, in Les Misérables, at the Queen's Theatre, working with Alfie Boe, Matt Lucas where he stayed with the show for 1 year. He reprised his role from the stage musical as Gavroche for the film adaptation of Les Misérables and also played the role of Jack in the 2014 film version of Into the Woods.

He filmed London Town in the summer of 2015, where he worked with Jonathan Rhys Meyers.
Huddlestone played Brian Fawcett in The Lost City of Z. The film premiered at the New York Film Festival on 15 October 2016.

Early and personal life
Huttlestone was born on 17 September 1999 in Havering, Greater London, England, the second of three children of Linda, a homemaker, and Mark Huttlestone, a company managing director. He has an elder brother, Thomas Andrew (born 1997), who is also an actor and has appeared as Friedrich Von Trapp in The Sound of Music UK Tour 2011. His younger sister, Sarah Rosina (born 2005), is an actress who is set to appear in Regent's Open Air Theatre production of The Sound of Music, with his former Les Misérables co-star Isabelle Allen.

Filmography

References

External links
 
 

1999 births
Living people
21st-century English male actors
English male child actors
English male film actors
English male stage actors
Male actors from Essex
Male actors from London
People from the London Borough of Havering